The Central Council of Muslims in Germany (ZMD) is an Islamic organization in Germany. With 15,000 to 20,000 members, mainly German, German Arab, and German Turkish Muslims, it has less than half the size of the Islamrat für die Bundesrepublik Deutschland.

The Central Council was founded in 1994 by Nadeem Elyas, and since 2006 it has been led by Ayyub Axel Köhler. Its secretary-general is Aiman Mazyek. It is located in Cologne, Germany.

Affiliated organizations also belonging to Islamisches Konzil in Deutschland 

The following organizations belong to the Central Council of Muslims in Germany and to the Islamic Council in Germany (Islamisches Konzil in Deutschland):

Islamische Gemeinschaft in Deutschland,
Muslimische Studentenvereinigung,
Union Islamisch-Albanischer Zentren in Deutschland,
Union der Türkisch-Islamischen Kulturvereine in Europa and
Verband islamischer Gemeinden der Bosniaken
The former leader of the Islamic Council in Germany, Abdullah al-Turki, is the leader of the Muslim World League (seat in Saudi-Arabia).

Affiliated organizations also belonging to Islamische Gemeinschaft in Deutschland 

Islamisches Zentrum München and Islamisches Bildungswerk belong to the Islamische Gemeinschaft in Deutschland and to the Central Council of Muslims in Germany.
The Islamische Gemeinschaft is affiliated to the Central Council of Muslims in Germany and to the Muslim Brotherhood.

Affiliated organizations also belonging to Islamische Avantgarden 

Islamische Avantgarden were founded by the former leader of the Syrian division of the Muslim brotherhood. Islamisches Zentrum Aachen and Bundesverband für Islamische Tätigkeiten belong to the Islamische Avantgarden and the Central Council of Muslims in Germany.

The other affiliated organizations 

Islamische Religionsgemeinschaft Berlin belongs to the Central Council of Muslims in Germany and is dominated by the Islamische Gemeinschaft Milli Görüş.
Islamisches Zentrum Hamburg is an affiliated organization and is dominated by the government of Iran.
Islamische Gemeinschaft in Hamburg is close to the Islamic Centre Hamburg and an organization affiliated to the Central Council of Muslims in Germany.
Haus des Islam is an affiliated organization, which is close to the Islamisches Zentrum Aachen of the Muslim Brotherhood. The other affiliated organizations are
Deutsche Muslim-Liga Bonn,
Deutsche Muslim-Liga Hamburg,
Haqqani Trust - Verein für neue deutsche Muslime, and
Islamische Arbeitsgemeinschaft für Sozial- und Erziehungsberufe.

See also 
 Council on American-Islamic Relations
 Islam in Germany
 Islamic Commission of Spain
 French Council of the Muslim Faith
 Muslim Council of Britain
 Muslim Council of Sweden
 Muslim Executive of Belgium

External links
  http://www.zentralrat.de/ Website of the Zentralrats der Muslime in Deutschland
  http://www.zentralrat.de/3035.php Islamic Charta of 20.02.2002
 https://web.archive.org/web/20061230082555/http://www.religionfacts.com/islam/places/germany.htm
 

Islamic organisations based in Germany
Organisations based in Cologne
Islamic organizations established in 1994
1994 establishments in Germany